Dihydrotestosterone (DHT) may refer to:

 5α-Dihydrotestosterone – an active metabolite of testosterone and potent androgen steroid hormone
 5β-Dihydrotestosterone – an inactive metabolite of testosterone

See also
 Testosterone
 Androstanediol
 Androstanedione